The 2017 Lodz Sevens is the second tournament of the 2017 Rugby Europe Grand Prix Series, hosted by Stadion Miejski at Łódź. It was held over the weekend of 10–11 June 2017, and with Russia's finals victory over Spain with Ireland taking bronze, there was a three-way tie for first in the series by the tournament's end.

Teams

Pool Stage

Pool A

Pool B

Pool C

Knockout stage

Challenge Trophy

5th Place

Cup

Overall

References

External links
 Official page 

2017 in Polish sport
Grand Prix 2
rugby union
International rugby union competitions hosted by Poland
Rugby sevens in Poland